Carmelo Abbate (born 5 August 1971 in Castelbuono, Italy) is an Italian journalist and reporter.

Biography
He works for the Italian weekly magazine Panorama, where he began as a collaborator and today he serves as Senior Editor, in the past he has held the same job for the cultural section of the magazine. As an undercover reporter he conducted several major investigations, in particular with regard to social and economic topics, illegal immigration and catholic church scandals such as homosexuality in the Catholic Church, or Catholic priests involved in pedophilia. His book Sex and the Vatican: a secret journey in the reign of the chaste was ignored by most of the mainstream Italian media, but instead became a bestseller in France.

Nel 2018 lancia "Storie Nere", an exceptionally highly attractive editorial format on its social channels, in which it reacts briefly with specific narrative stresses, story of cronaca nera riguardante sia la gente comune that famous characters.

Publications
La Trappola, Milano, Piemme, 2008
L'onorata società: caste e baroni dell'Italia che lavora, Milano, Piemme, 2009
Babilonia, Milano, Piemme, 2010
Sex and the Vatican: viaggio segreto nel regno dei casti, Milano, Piemme, 2011
Golgota: viaggio segreto tra chiesa e pedofilia, Milano, Piemme, 2012

References

1971 births
Living people
People from Castelbuono
20th-century Italian journalists
Italian male journalists
21st-century Italian journalists
Writers from the Province of Palermo
20th-century Italian male writers